Helen Jackson was an English tennis player who played during the last decade of the 19th century.

Career
In 1887 she won the  Darlington Open Tournament. In 1891 Jackson competed in the singles event at the Wimbledon Championships for the first time. In the first round she defeated Maud Shackle, but lost in the quarterfinals to Bertha Steedman in two sets. The following year, 1892, she lost in the first round (which was the quarterfinal) to Shackle. Her last entry came in 1895 when she reached the final of the All-comers' event after victories against J.M. Corder, Bernard and Alice Pickering. She lost the final in two close sets to Charlotte Cooper after having led both sets 5–0.

In 1894 she had defeated Cooper in the final of the South of England Championships held at the Devonshire Park Lawn Tennis Club, in Eastbourne. That same year she also became the singles champion at the Welsh Championships in Penarth after a straight-sets win in the final against Ethel Cochrane. She lost her title in 1895 after a defeat in a three-sets final to Jane Corder.

Jackson won three consecutive singles titles at the Scottish Championships between 1890 and 1892.

Grand Slam finals

Singles (1 runner-up)

Notes

References 

English female tennis players
Year of birth missing
Year of death missing